Joanne Quay Swee Ling (born 17 March 1980) is a Malaysian former badminton player. Quay was the gold medalist at the 1998 World Junior Championships in the mixed doubles event partnered with Chan Chong Ming. She and Chan also won the silver medal in Asian Junior Championships. She was part of the national team that won the women's team silver medal at the 1998 Commonwelath Games. Quay left the Badminton Association of Malaysia in 2004 and joined the Kuala Lumpur Racquet Club (KLRC). She then went on to study at the Leeds Metropolitan University majoring in sports business management. As a Leeds Met Carnegie, she took part in badminton competition, and at the 2009 BUCS Championships, she won double titles in the women's and mixed doubles event. Quay now works as BAM’s high performance manager.

Achievements

Asian Championships 
Women's doubles

World Junior Championships 
Mixed doubles

Asian Junior Championships 
Girls' doubles

IBF World Grand Prix
The World Badminton Grand Prix sanctioned by International Badminton Federation (IBF) since 1983.

Women's doubles

Mixed doubles

BWF International Challenge/Series 
Women's doubles

Mixed doubles

 BWF International Challenge tournament
 BWF International Series tournament
 BWF Future Series tournament

References

External links
 
 

1980 births
Living people
Malaysian female badminton players
Malaysian sportspeople of Chinese descent
Alumni of Leeds Beckett University
Badminton players at the 1998 Commonwealth Games
Commonwealth Games silver medallists for Malaysia
Commonwealth Games medallists in badminton
Badminton players at the 1998 Asian Games
Badminton players at the 2006 Asian Games
Asian Games competitors for Malaysia
Competitors at the 1999 Southeast Asian Games
Competitors at the 2001 Southeast Asian Games
Southeast Asian Games bronze medalists for Malaysia
Southeast Asian Games medalists in badminton
Medallists at the 1998 Commonwealth Games